Mehdi Meriah (born 5 June 1979) is a retired Tunisian football (soccer) player who played as a left back or a midfielder.

He was called up to the Tunisian national team to participate in the 2006 World Cup but after he sustained an injury in the week leading up to the tournament was replaced by Haykel Guemamdia.

External links

1979 births
Living people
Tunisian footballers
Tunisia international footballers
Club Africain players
AS Ariana players
AS Djerba players
EGS Gafsa players
US Monastir (football) players
Étoile Sportive du Sahel players
2008 Africa Cup of Nations players
Association football defenders